The Monday Night Miracle was an NFL Monday night game between the New York Jets and Miami Dolphins played at Giants Stadium on October 23, 2000. The Jets scored 30 points in the fourth quarter, twice tying the score, and sending the game into overtime, where they defeated the Dolphins, 40–37.

Background
Like their 1994 showdown at Giants Stadium which was made famous by Dan Marino's "fake spike", this game was for first place in the AFC East as the Jets were 4-1 and the Dolphins were 5-0. But unlike the 1994 game which featured the Jets failing to hold a double-digit (18) lead in the second half, it was the Dolphins who failed to hold the lead.

The game is notable for having the second largest fourth-quarter comeback in NFL history and the largest comeback in Jets history. It was also voted the greatest game televised on ABC's Monday Night Football, along with being #5 on NFL Top Ten's Top Ten Comebacks.

At the end of the third quarter with the score 30–7 in Miami's favor, Jets broadcaster Howard David announced, "And with a whole quarter to go, this game is over."

Jets comeback
The Jets proceeded to stage a furious rally in the fourth quarter, scoring 23 unanswered points to tie the game at 30.  They scored three touchdowns and a field goal, but a two-point conversion attempt to Curtis Martin was stopped. On the Dolphins' first play from scrimmage after the game was tied, they took the lead on a long touchdown pass by Jay Fiedler to Leslie Shepherd. However, the Jets still managed to drive downfield and tie the game.  One of the key plays was a 4th down catch at the Dolphins 2-yard line by Richie Anderson as he caught the ball despite a head-on hit by Zach Thomas and Dolphins defensive back Jerry Wilson.  Improbably, the tying touchdown was caught by offensive tackle John "Jumbo" Elliott, playing as a tackle-eligible. After Elliott caught the touchdown pass, Dennis Miller remarked how opposing defenses, "couldn't keep him down forever."  In the overtime Fiedler was intercepted by Marcus Coleman but Coleman was hit by Thurman Thomas and fumbled the ball back to the Dolphins.  Several plays later, Coleman intercepted Fiedler again and this time held on.   An eventual Vinny Testaverde pass to Wayne Chrebet put the Jets in field goal range, and a pass that was nearly intercepted by Jerry Wilson hit the ground first, nullifying the turnover.   Jets kicker John Hall then won the game with a field goal with 8:13 remaining in the extra session.

Actor Arnold Schwarzenegger, while visiting the ABC broadcast booth, said after halftime,  

The Monday night game for the Jets was in between Games 2 and 3 of the All New York (Yankees vs. Mets) 2000 World Series. The series overshadowed the game. In fact, the crowd broke out into "Let's Go Yankees" chants countered by "Let's Go Mets" chants during the third quarter.

Game summary

Officials 
Referee: Walt Coleman (#65)
Umpire: Undrey Wash (#96)
Head Linesman: John Schleyer (#21)
Line Judge: Dave Anderson (#81)
Field Judge: Scott Steenson (#88)
Side Judge: Bill Spyksma (#12)
Back Judge: Ron Spitler (#119)

See also
 Dolphins–Jets rivalry
 The Monday Night Miracle (ice hockey)

References

External links
 

2000 National Football League season
National Football League games
New York Jets
Monday Night Football
Miami Dolphins
October 2000 sports events in the United States
2000 in sports in New Jersey
Sports competitions in East Rutherford, New Jersey
American football incidents
Nicknamed sporting events